Layer Marney is a village and civil parish near to Tiptree, in the Colchester borough, in the county of Essex, England. Layer Marney has a Tudor palace called Layer Marney Tower and a church called Church of St Mary the Virgin.

History
The ancient village was in the hundred of Winstree in 1086.
 
In 1879 Kezia Peache and her brother became the Lord and Lady of the Manor of Layer Marney. The Peache siblings paid for the substantial repairs required to Layer Marcher Tower.

In 2001 the population of the civil parish of Layer Marney was 206.

References

External links 

 http://www.britishlistedbuildings.co.uk/england/essex/layer+marney

Villages in Essex
Borough of Colchester